Sunken Rocks is a 1919 British silent drama film directed by Cecil M. Hepworth and starring Alma Taylor, Gerald Ames and James Carew.

Cast
 Alma Taylor as Evelyn Farrar 
 Gerald Ames as Dr. Purnell 
 James Carew as J.H. Farrar 
 Nigel Playfair as Mr. Gurney 
 John MacAndrews as Tramp 
 Minnie Rayner as Cook

References

Bibliography
 Palmer, Scott. British Film Actors' Credits, 1895-1987. McFarland, 1988.

External links

1919 films
1919 drama films
British drama films
British silent feature films
Films directed by Cecil Hepworth
Hepworth Pictures films
British black-and-white films
1910s English-language films
1910s British films
Silent drama films